Kulathupuzha Sastha Temple is a Hindu temple located on the banks of Kulathupuzha river, a tributary of Kallada River. It is located in Kulathupuzha in Punalur taluk of Kollam district in the Indian state of Kerala. The presiding deity there is Lord Ayyappa in the form of Balasastha. It is also one among the pancha sastha shrines and one of the 108 Sastha shrines in Kerala. The idol there is believed to be installed by Lord Parashurama, and is made up of eight pieces of stones. The temple is constructed as per Kerala style of Temple Architecture.

Deity 
Lord Ayyappa is the principal deity. He is in the form of Balasastha (child form of Ayyappa) and commonly known as 'Kulathupuzha Balakan'. There is a popular song titled 'Kulathupuzhayile Balakane' praising the deity of this temple, along with the deities of Achankovil, Aryankavu, Sasthamcotta, Chamravattom and Sabarimala temples.

Location of temple 
The temple is located by the shores of Kallada River within Kulathupuzha Reserve Forest range at the east part of Kollam district. The Hill Highway that pass through Kulathupuzha connects temple with Punalur, Anchal and Kollam. The State Highway 2 that passes through Kulathupuzha connects the temple with National Highway 744, Thiruvananthapuram district and Tenkasi district. 

The nearest airport is Trivandrum International Airport. (65 kms)

Subordinate deities 
The deity here is in a fierce mood (ugramūrti) as well as in auspicious mood (mangalapradāyakan). Shiva, Yakshi, Vishnu, Ganapathi, Boothathan, Nagar, and Karuppaswami are the other subordinate deities in the temple.

Legend 
Legend has it that the temple was founded by Pandalam raja,  but the idol of Sastha was founded by a Brahmin from Kottarakkara. Earlier, the temple was under the possession of Kottarakkara raja. Later it was handed over to Travancore devaswom board. The tantric rights of the temple are held by Kokkalathu mutt.

Thirumakkal of Ayyappa
The temple pond preserves a number of fishes, as they are considered to the favorite ones of Lord Ayyappa. Devotees offer Meenoottu vazhipadu for healing the warts in the skin. Devotees are concerned about protecting the fishes in this pond. They are known as the Thirumakkal of Lord Ayyappa. Most of this fishes are belonging to species Tor khudree and Hypselobarbus thomassi that are having threat of extinction. Fishing is also strictly prohibited here.

References

Hindu temples in Kollam district